The 1993 NCAA Division I women's basketball tournament began on March 17 and ended on April 4. The tournament featured 48 teams. The Final Four consisted of Ohio State, Iowa, Vanderbilt, and Texas Tech, with Texas Tech defeating Ohio State 84–82 to win its first NCAA title. Texas Tech's Sheryl Swoopes was named the Most Outstanding Player of the tournament.

To date, this is the last time UConn has failed to advance to the Sweet Sixteen or later.

Notable events
Ohio State failed to earn an invitation to the NCAA tournament in the prior two years, but in 1993, they added Katie Smith, the Gatorade National player of the year,  to the roster, who helped lead the team to a 24–3 regular season record and an NCAA invitation as a 1 seed. The Buckeyes won their first two games easily, but faced a challenge in the East Regional final game against Virginia. The Cavaliers had been in the three previous Final Fours, including a national runner up finish in 1991. Despite 30 points from Virginia's Heather Burge, the Ohio State team won a close match, 75–73, to move on to their first ever NCAA Final Four. With time winding down, and trailing by two points, Virginia raced down the court and Dena Evans would hit a three-point shot, but it was disallowed, because the coach had called a timeout with 0.6 seconds left in the game. The inbounds pass was never touched, and went out of bounds, turning the ball over to Ohio State. Although they only had to inbound the ball, the inbounder stepped on the line, giving the ball back to Virginia. However, the inbounds pass by the Cavaliers was blocked, and Ohio State held on to win.

In the Mideast Regional, the Tennessee team was the top seed. Tennessee had won the National Championship three of the prior six years an advanced to the regional final with wins of 20 points or more in their first two games. Iowa, who had shared the championship of the Big Ten with Ohio State, was the second seed in the region, and faced Tennessee in the regional Final. Iowa was coached by Hall of Fame coach C. Vivian Stringer who had lost her husband to a heart attack during the season. The Tennessee team was trying to win the 500th victory for their coach Pat Summitt. The Iowa team would prevail, sending Iowa to their first ever Final Four (although the coach had been in the first NCAA Final four as coach of Cheyney State).

Texas Tech was the second seeded team in the West regional, where long time power Stanford was the top seed. However, Colorado upset Stanford in the regional semi-finals, while Texas Tech beat Washington, then USC to face Colorado in the regional finals. That game wasn't close, as Texas Tech, with Sheryl Swoopes, the "Michael Jordan of women's basketball" beat Colorado by 25 points to make it to their first ever Final Four. This set up a match up with Vanderbilt, the number one seeded winner of the Midwest Regional, who were also appearing in their first ever Final Four.

The Final Four included four teams who had never been in a Final Four before, the first time that had happened since the very first NCAA Final Four in 1982. In one semifinal,  second seeded Texas Tech faced a number one seed in Vanderbilt, but Texas Tech would win easily, 60–46, while Vanderbilt set a tournament record for fewest points in a half, of a semi-final game, with only 20 points in the second half.

In  the other semifinal, two Big Ten teams faced each other. Ohio State and Iowa had squared off twice in the regular season, with each winning their game at home. This time, they faced each other for the chance to play in the national championship game. At the end of regulation though, the game was tied, and they had to go to an overtime period. A timeout had been crucial in the Ohio State win over Virginia, and would become crucial in this game as well. Near the end of the game, the Iowa coach tried to signal a timeout, but the refs did not see the signal, and Iowa player Laurie Aaron tripped over a player on the floor with six seconds to go, losing the ball and turning it over. Ohio State recovered the ball and held on for a one-point victory 73–72.

In the championship game, Swoopes scored 23 points in the first half to help Texas Tech take a nine-point lead at half-time. The Buckeyes did not fold, and fought back to take a 55–54 lead midway through the second half. However, Swoopes continued her record-breaking night, and scored 24 points in the second half. She completed a three-point play on a layup and foul shot to give her team a seven-point lead with under a minute to go. Ohio State hit two three-pointers in the final seconds, but it wasn't enough, and the Red Raiders won their first national championship with a score of 84–82.

Tournament records
 Points – Sheryl Swoopes scored 47 points in the championship game between Texas Tech and Ohio State, setting the record for most points scored in a Final Four game.
 Points in a half – Sheryl Swoopes scored 24 points in the second half of the championship game between Texas Tech and Ohio state, setting the record for most points scored in a single half of a Final Four game.
 Field goals made – Sheryl Swoopes scored 16 baskets in the championship game between Texas Tech and Ohio State, setting the record for most field goals scored in a Final Four game.
 Free throw percentage – Sheryl Swoopes hit eleven of eleven free throw attempts in the championship game between Texas Tech and Ohio State, tying the record for best free throw percentage in a Final Four game. The eleven free throws was the most of the perfect results.
 Free throws attempted – Vanderbilt attempted a single free throw in the semi-final game against Texas tech, the fewest free throw attempts in a Final Four game.
 Personal fouls – Texas Tech committed eight personal fouls against Vanderbilt in the semi-final game, committing the fewest personal fouls in a Final Four game.
 Points – Sheryl Swoopes scored 78 points in the two final four games in 1993, setting the record for most points scored in a Final Four.
 Free throw percentage – Rutgers hit four of fifteen free throw attempts (26.7%) which is the lowest free throw percentage in an NCAA tournament game.
 Points – Sheryl Swoopes scored 177 points in the 1993 NCAA tournament setting the record for most points scored in a tournament.
 Free throws – Sheryl Swoopes took 57 free throw shots in the 1993 NCAA tournament setting the record for most free throws attempted in a tournament.
 Free throw percentage – Sheryl Swoopes hit 108 of 133 free throw attempts(81.2%) in the 1993 NCAA tournament setting the record for the best free throw percentage in a tournament.

Qualifying teams – automatic
Forty-eight teams were selected to participate in the 1993 NCAA Tournament. Twenty-three conferences were eligible for an automatic bid to the 1993 NCAA tournament.

Qualifying teams – at-large
Twenty-five additional teams were selected to complete the forty-eight invitations.

Bids by conference
Twenty-three conferences earned an automatic bid.  In fourteen cases, the automatic bid was the only representative from the conference. Two conferences, Great Midwest and North Atlantic sent a single representative as an at-large team. Twenty-three additional at-large teams were selected from nine of the conferences.

First and second rounds

In 1993, the field remained at 48 teams. The teams were seeded, and assigned to four geographic regions, with seeds 1–12 in each region. In Round 1, seeds 8 and 9 faced each other for the opportunity to face the 1 seed in the second round, seeds 7 and 10 played for the opportunity to face the 2 seed, seeds 5 and 12 played for the opportunity to face the 4 seed, and seeds 6 and 11 played for the opportunity to face the 3 seed. In the first two rounds, the higher seed was given the opportunity to host the first-round game. In most cases, the higher seed accepted the opportunity. The exception:

 Second seeded Iowa played seventh seeded Old Dominion at Old Dominion

Old Dominion served as a host for the first round as well as the second round, so it is listed twice.

The following table lists the region, host school, venue and the thirty-two first and second round locations:

Regionals and  Final Four

The Regionals, named for the general  location, were held from March 25 to March 27 at these sites:

  Regional  Richmond Coliseum, Richmond, Virginia (Host: Virginia Commonwealth)
 Mideast Regional   Carver–Hawkeye Arena, Iowa City, Iowa (Host: University of Iowa)
 Midwest Regional  William R. Johnson Coliseum, Nacogdoches, Texas (Host: Stephen F. Austin University)
 West Regional  Dahlberg Arena, Missoula, Montana (Host: University of Montana)

Each regional winner advanced to the  Final Four, held April 3 and April 4 in Atlanta, Georgia  at the Omni Coliseum, (Host: Georgia Tech)

Bids by state

The forty-eight teams came from twenty-seven states, plus Washington, D.C. California had the most teams with six bids. Twenty-three states did not have any teams receiving bids.

Brackets
First and second-round games played at higher seed except where noted.

East regional – Richmond, VA

Mideast regional – Iowa City, IA

Midwest regional – Nacogdoches, Texas

West regional – Missoula, MT

Final Four – Atlanta, GA

Record by  conference
Fifteen conferences had more than one  bid, or at least one win in NCAA Tournament play:

Ten conferences went  0-1: Big Sky Conference, Great Midwest Conference, MAAC, MAC, Mid-Continent, Midwestern Collegiate, North Atlantic Conference, Ohio Valley Conference, Southern Conference, and West Coast Conference

All-Tournament team

 Sheryl Swoopes, Texas Tech
 Krista Kirkland, Texas Tech
 Nikki Keyton, Ohio State
 Katie Smith, Ohio State
 Heidi Gillingham, Vanderbilt

Game officials

 June Courteau (semifinal)
 Larry Sheppard (semifinal)
 Bob Gallagher (semifinal)
 Carla Fujimoto (semifinal)
 Sally Bell (final)
 Bill Stokes (final)

See also
 1993 NCAA Division I men's basketball tournament
 1993 NCAA Division II women's basketball tournament
 1993 NCAA Division III women's basketball tournament
 1993 NAIA Division I women's basketball tournament
 1993 NAIA Division II women's basketball tournament

References

1992–93 NCAA Division I women's basketball season
NCAA Division I women's basketball tournament
NCAA Division I women's basketball tournament
NCAA Division I women's basketball tournament
Basketball competitions in Atlanta
College sports tournaments in Georgia (U.S. state)
1993 in sports in Georgia (U.S. state)
Women's sports in Georgia (U.S. state)